Margaret 'Peggy' Franks is a former table tennis player from England.

Table tennis career
From 1947 to 1952 she won ten medals in singles, doubles, and team events in the World Table Tennis Championships.

The ten medals included three gold medals; two in team events with England at the 
1947 World Table Tennis Championships and 1948 World Table Tennis Championships and one in the women's doubles with Vera Thomas in 1948.

She also won an English Open title.

Personal life
She married Kent and Essex county player Ronnie Hook on 12 January 1950.

See also
 List of table tennis players
 List of World Table Tennis Championships medalists
 List of England players at the World Team Table Tennis Championships

References

English female table tennis players
Possibly living people
Year of birth missing